Salt Lake Station was a railway station in Los Angeles, California. It was located on the east side of the Los Angeles River at 1st Street. It was built by the Los Angeles Terminal Railway and began service in 1891, becoming a part of the Los Angeles and Salt Lake Railroad in 1901 and the Union Pacific Railroad system in 1921. Local streetcar service was provided by the Los Angeles Railway. The building was heavily damaged in a fire in 1924, prompting the railroad to move passenger operations to Southern Pacific's Central Station.

References

External links

Railway stations in Los Angeles
Los Angeles and Salt Lake Railroad
Former Union Pacific Railroad stations in Los Angeles County, California
Demolished buildings and structures in Los Angeles
Demolished railway stations in the United States
History of Los Angeles
Demolished buildings and structures in California
Railway stations in the United States opened in 1891
1891 establishments in California
1890s architecture in the United States
Railway stations closed in 1924
1924 disestablishments in California